Diana García (born 21 December 1992 in Mexico City) is a Mexican professional squash player. As of February 2018, she was ranked number 79 in the world.

References

1992 births
Living people
Mexican female squash players
Squash players at the 2019 Pan American Games
Pan American Games medalists in squash
Pan American Games silver medalists for Mexico
Pan American Games bronze medalists for Mexico
Squash players at the 2015 Pan American Games
Medalists at the 2019 Pan American Games
Medalists at the 2015 Pan American Games